Viktor Baranov (born 1893, date of death unknown) was a Russian diver. He competed in the men's plain high diving event at the 1912 Summer Olympics.

References

1893 births
Year of death missing
Russian male divers
Olympic divers of Russia
Divers at the 1912 Summer Olympics
Divers from Tallinn